Brickellia floribunda, the Chihuahuan brickellbush, is a North American species of flowering plants in the family Asteraceae. It is native to northern Mexico (Baja California Sur, Sonora and Chihuahua) and the south-western United States (Arizona and New Mexico).

Brickellia floribunda is a branching shrub up to 200 cm (80 inches) tall. The plant produces many small flower heads with white or pale yellow-green disc florets but no ray florets.

References

External links
Vascular Plants of the Gila Wilderness
Arizona Cooperative Extension, Yavapai County Native & Naturalized Plants

floribunda
Flora of Mexico
Flora of the Southwestern United States
Plants described in 1853